Sphenomorphus striolatus  is a species of skink found in Indonesia.

References

striolatus
Taxa named by Max Carl Wilhelm Weber
Reptiles described in 1890
Fauna of the Lesser Sunda Islands